Tan Miao (born January 6, 1987 in Jinan, Shandong) is a female Chinese swimmer, who won a silver medal for China at the 2008 Summer Olympics.

Major achievements
2008 National Champions Tournament - 1st 400m free

References
http://2008teamchina.olympic.cn/index.php/personview/personsen/5363

1987 births
Living people
Olympic silver medalists for China
Olympic swimmers of China
Sportspeople from Jinan
Swimmers at the 2008 Summer Olympics
Chinese female freestyle swimmers
Swimmers from Shandong
Medalists at the 2008 Summer Olympics
Olympic silver medalists in swimming
Universiade medalists in swimming
Universiade silver medalists for China
Medalists at the 2007 Summer Universiade
21st-century Chinese women